About Sunny (also titled Think of Me) is a 2011 American drama film directed by Bryan Wizemann and Mike S. Ryan and starring Lauren Ambrose, Dylan Baker and Penelope Ann Miller.

Cast
Lauren Ambrose as Angela
Audrey Scott as Sunny
Dylan Baker as Max
Penelope Ann Miller as Louise 
David Conrad as Ted
Adina Porter as Cheryl
Craig Gray as Michael

Reception
The film has an 83% rating on Rotten Tomatoes.

References

External links
 
 

American drama films
2010s English-language films
2010s American films